Bahía Solano is a municipality and town in the Chocó Department, Colombia.  Bahia, as it is locally known, is an economic and tourist center of coastal Choco. The municipal head is Ciudad Mutis.

Bahia is home to José Celestino Mutis Airport as well as seaport, and along with daily flights to and from Medellin, Quibdo, Cali, and Bogota, there are bi-weekly ships that take passengers and cargo from Bahia to the port of Buenaventura. The region around Bahia Solano is home to  scuba diving and sport fishing opportunities, providing a plethora of marine activities to the traveller. 18 km away from Bahia Solano, is the beach town of El Valle, Choco, which is the closest community to Ensenada de Utria National Park, located only  down the beach.

Climate
Bahía Solano has a very wet tropical rainforest climate (Af).

References

Weblinks 
 Alcaldía Municipal de Bahía Solano (Spanish)
 Website for Eco Tourism (English)

Municipalities of Chocó Department